Seán French (8 November 1931 – 25 December 2011) was a Fianna Fáil politician from Cork in Ireland. He was a Teachta Dála (TD) from 1967 to 1982.

French was elected to Dáil Éireann on his first attempt, at a by-election in 1967 for the Cork Borough constituency which was caused by the death of the Labour Party TD Seán Casey. He was re-elected at the next five general elections, but lost his seat at the November 1982 general election and did not stand again.

He also stood as a candidate for the European Parliament, at the first direct election in 1979 in the Munster constituency, but was not elected.

Seán French was Lord Mayor of Cork for the term from 1976 to 1977. His father, also called Seán French, also served as a TD and Lord Mayor of Cork.

See also
Families in the Oireachtas

References

 

1931 births
2011 deaths
Fianna Fáil TDs
Members of the 18th Dáil
Members of the 19th Dáil
Members of the 20th Dáil
Members of the 21st Dáil
Members of the 22nd Dáil
Members of the 23rd Dáil
Lord Mayors of Cork